In computational geometry, the Urquhart graph of a set of points in the plane, named after Roderick B. Urquhart, is obtained by removing the longest edge from each triangle in the Delaunay triangulation.

Since Delaunay triangulations can be constructed in time , the same time bound holds for the Urquhart graph as well. Although it was later shown that the Urquhart graph is not exactly the same as the relative neighborhood graph, it can be used as a good approximation to it.

Like the relative neighborhood graph, the Urquhart graph of a set of points in general position contains the Euclidean minimum spanning tree of its points, from which it follows that it is a connected graph.

References 

Computational geometry
Geometric graphs